The 2021–22 Macedonian Handball Super League was the 30th season of the Super League, North Macedonian premier handball league. It ram from 12 September 2021 to 3 June 2022.

Vardar won their fifteenth title.

Teams

Arenas and locations
The following 12 clubs compete in the Super League during the 2021–22 season:

Regular season

League table

Second round

Championship round

Relegation round

Promotion/relegation play-offs
The 11th-placed teams of the Macedonian Super League faces the 4th-placed team of the Group B in Macedonian First League.

|}
Skopje 2020 won the 28–27 int these match, and therefore both clubs remain in their respective leagues.

See also
 2022 Macedonian Handball Cup

References

External links
Macedonian Handball Federation 

Handball competitions in North Macedonia
North Macedonia
Handball
Handball